The New Zealand national beach soccer team represent New Zealand in international beach soccer competitions. They are controlled by NZF, the governing body for soccer in New Zealand. To date, New Zealand have competed in one OFC Beach Soccer Championship, in 2007.

Squad
Correct as of July 2007.

Achievements
FIFA Beach Soccer World Cup qualification (OFC)
2007 – 3rd

References

Oceanian national beach soccer teams
Beach Soccer